Dakshinpat Xatra is a well-known Xatra (socio-religious institution) on Majuli island in the Brahmaputra River, in the Indian state of Assam established by Vamshigopal disciple Satradhikar Sri Vanamalidev in 1584. He was honoured and treated with much respect by the reigning Ahom kingdom monarch Jayadhwaj Singha who made liberal gifts to the Xatra. An ornate gateway engraved with religious motifs, animals and flowers forms the entrance while inside similar sculptures and paintings with divine overtones adorn the walls of the Namghar and heighten the aesthetic appeal of the sacred precincts where the idol of Mahaprabhu Jadavarai is worshipped. The satra belongs to the sect known as the Brahmasamhati, founded by Damodardev. It deviates from the teachings of Sankaradev and performs idol worship, brahminical ritual and takes a rigid view of caste distinction with the Brahmans considered to be the superior and the satradhikar is chosen from a Brahmin family.

Dakshinpat Xatra is a treasure house of dances contributed by Shri Shri Sankardeva such as the Borgeet, Matiakhara, Jumora, Chali, Noyua, Nande Vringee, Sutradhar, Ozapali, Apsara, Satria Krishna and Dasavater among others while it is also a storehouse of antiques of cultural importance and an advanced centre for the performing arts.

Due to constant flooding and erosion in Majuli, a new Xatra had been built in Chatai, Jorhat, but two decades after its completion, the Dakshinpat Xatra has not yet moved to the new location.

Satradhikar and Bhakats
Monks known as bhakats live in Xatras under the supervision of a Satradhikar and Dakshinpat Xatra currently has about 90 to 100 celibate (udasin) bhakats. Xatra Satradhikars are elected from other Xatras where marriage is permitted. The chosen young man is brought into the Xatra as a teenager and trained in the Vaishnava religion, philosophy and life. During the period of training the young devotee is called "Deka-Adhikar", or young pontiff.

The Satradhikars have taken great pains and precautions to preserve the relics and manuscripts of the saint Srimanta Sankardeva written on strips of bark from the "Sanchi tree" (Aquilaria malaccensis) in his own hand in the humid and semi-tropical climate of Assam.
Name of present Satradhikar is Sri Sri Nonigopal Dev Goswami

Raasleela
During Raasleela, several thousand devotees visit the holy Xatra every year with the occasion now observed as one of the National Festivals of Assam. Xatras are socio-religious institutions in the Assam region that belong to the Mahapuruxiya Dharma. The Xatras are not merely religious institutions but play cultural and historical roles in society. A dance form initiated by Srimanta Sankardeva and later developed within the Xatra is thus called Sattriya and forms one of the eight classical Indian dance styles.

List of Satradhikars
Damudar Devgoswami
Balu Devgoswami
Paramananda Devgoswami
Banamali Devgoswami
Ram Devgoswami
Krishna Devgoswami
Aatma Devgoswami
Kam Devgoswami
Saha Devgoswami
Ronti Devgoswami
Bishnu Devgoswami
Bibhu Devgoswami
Bashu Devgoswami
Shuva Devgoswami
Nara Devgoswami
Narayan Devgoswami
Hari Devgoswami
Ramananda Devgoswami

Notes

References

External links 
Dakhinpat Satra A Cultural & Religious Monastery Of Majuli

Majuli
Ekasarana Dharma
Hindu pilgrimage sites in India
Vaishnavism
Satras (Ekasarana Dharma)
Majuli district